Pleurotomella obesa is a species of sea snail, a marine gastropod mollusk in the family Raphitomidae.

Description
The length of the shell attains 10.5 mm, its diameter 6 mm.

Distribution
This species occurs in the Eastern Atlantic Ocean.

References

 Gofas, S.; Le Renard, J.; Bouchet, P. (2001). Mollusca. in: Costello, M.J. et al. (eds), European Register of Marine Species: a check-list of the marine species in Europe and a bibliography of guides to their identification. Patrimoines Naturels. 50: 180-213.

External links
 

obesa
Gastropods described in 1980